This is a list of VTV dramas released in 2002.

←2001 - 2002 - 2003→

VTV Tet dramas
These films air on VTV channels during Tet holiday.

VTV1

VTV3

VTV1 Monday night dramas
These dramas air in every Monday night from 21:00 to 22:00 on VTV1.

VTV3 Cinema For Saturday Afternoon dramas
These dramas air in early Saturday afternoon on VTV3 with the duration approximately 70 minutes as a part of the program Cinema for Saturday afternoon (Vietnamese: Điện ảnh chiều thứ Bảy).

Note: The time slot was delayed 2 weeks (on 1 & 8 Jun) due to the broadcast schedule for 2002 FIFA World Cup.

VTV3 Sunday Literature & Art dramas
These dramas air in early Sunday afternoon on VTV3 as a part of the program Sunday Literature & Art (Vietnamese: Văn nghệ Chủ Nhật).

For The First Time On VTV3 Screen dramas
These dramas air in Sunday night after the 19:00 News Report (aired later or delayed in occasions of special events) under the name of the program For The First Time On VTV3 Screen (Vietnamese: Lần đầu tiên trên màn ảnh VTV3).

Note: Unlisted airtime periods were spent for special events.

See also
 List of dramas broadcast by Vietnam Television (VTV)
 List of dramas broadcast by Hanoi Radio Television (HanoiTV)
 List of dramas broadcast by Vietnam Digital Television (VTC)

References

External links
VTV.gov.vn – Official VTV Website 
VTV.vn – Official VTV Online Newspaper 

Vietnam Television original programming
2002 in Vietnamese television